Euodynerus annulatus is a species of stinging wasp in the family Vespidae.

Subspecies
These five subspecies belong to the species Euodynerus annulatus:
 Euodynerus annulatus annulatus
 Euodynerus annulatus arvensis (de Saussure, 1869)
 Euodynerus annulatus evectus (Cresson, 1872)
 Euodynerus annulatus imperialis (Bohart, 1945)
 Euodynerus annulatus sulphureus (de Saussure, 1858)

References

Further reading

External links

 

Potter wasps
Insects described in 1824